Mount Jacobsen, 3031 m (9944 feet), is a mountain in the northernmost Pacific Ranges of the Coast Mountains in the Central Coast region of British Columbia, Canada, located to the south of the Bella Coola Valley and immediately south of Ape Lake, to the west of the valley of the Talchako River.  

Name origin
Mount Jacobsen and West Jacobsen Peak are named for B.F. Jacobsen, who settled in the Bella Coola Valley prior to 1890 and was who encouraged the Reverend Christian Saugstad, the namesake of Mount Saugstad, to move his colony of Norwegian immigrants to Bella Coola from Minnesota.

References

Pacific Ranges
Norwegian Canadian history
Three-thousanders of British Columbia
Range 3 Coast Land District